Kanakchur is an aromatic rice cultivar from West Bengal, India. It has a slender grain and sweet aroma. The popped rice prepared from Kanakchur retains the aroma. The popped Kanakchur and Nalen Gur is used to prepare the Jaynagarer Moa.

See also 
Jaynagarer Moa
Gobindobhog

References 

Rice varieties
Rice production in India
Agriculture in West Bengal